Colonel Edward Nott (1657 – August 23, 1706) was an English Colonial Governor of Virginia. He was appointed by Queen Anne on either April 25, 1705 or August 15, 1705. His administration lasted only one year, as he died in 1706 at the age of 49. He is interred at Bruton Parish Church in Williamsburg, Virginia. He is noted as having been a "mild, benevolent man."

See also
Colony of Virginia
Governor's Palace
List of colonial governors of Virginia
History of Virginia

References

Colonial governors of Virginia
1654 births
1706 deaths
Burials at Bruton Parish Church
English army officers